Shades of a Blue Orphanage is the second studio album by Irish rock band Thin Lizzy, released in 1972. The title is a combination of the members' previous bands: Shades of Blue and Orphanage.

"Sarah" was written for Phil Lynott's grandmother who raised him when his mother, Philomena, was unable to do so. This song should not be confused with the 1979 song of the same name, for Lynott's daughter, included on Black Rose: A Rock Legend.

A remastered and expanded version of Shades of a Blue Orphanage was released on 11 October 2010.

Reception

Stuart Berman of Pitchfork stated that Thin Lizzy "weren’t lacking ambition at this stage, but rather direction", criticizing songs such as the album opener for its "early, clumsy stab at heaviosity from a band that, at this point, had a much better grasp of intimacy", but praising "Lynott’s lyrical voice" as a "sturdy anchor" to the band's output. Martin Popoff defined Shades of a Blue Orphanage "a honest work", showing hints of Lynott's folk acoustic past, "some '60s-directed progressive psychedelia and even out of context rockabilly" typical of such early 1970s rock records. Eduardo Rivadavia of AllMusic was largely critical of the album, describing it as "disappointing", and both the opening track and the title track as "overblown and disjointed". However, he picked out "Baby Face" and "Buffalo Gal" as bright moments, and praised Lynott's "eloquent and personal" performance on "Sarah".

Track listings

Singles
 Whiskey In The Jar / Black Boys on the Corner – 7" (1972)

Personnel
Thin Lizzy
 Philip Lynott – vocals, bass, rhythm guitar, acoustic guitar
 Eric Bell – lead guitar, acoustic guitar
 Brian Downey – drums, percussion

Additional musicians
 Clodagh Simonds – harpsichord, keyboards, mellotron
 Gary Moore – additional guitar on tracks 12–14

Production
Nick Tauber – producer
Louie Austin – engineer
Dick Plant, Tony Duggan, Desmond Najekodunmi – assistant engineer

References

Thin Lizzy albums
1972 albums
Decca Records albums